Verkhny Katrukh is a rural locality (a selo) in Rutulsky District, Republic of Dagestan, Russia. The population was  429 as of 2010. There are 3 streets.

Geography 
It is located 29 km northwest of Rutul.

Nationalities 
Laks live there.

References 

Rural localities in Rutulsky District